Gaerwen Football Club  is a Welsh football team based in Gaerwen, Anglesey, Wales.  The team currently play in the North Wales Coast West Football League Premier Division, which is at the fourth tier of the Welsh football league system.

History

In 2010–11 the club joined the newly formed Welsh Alliance League Division Two, and played in the league until the end of the 2019–20 season, with a best placed finish of fourth place in that season.  The club then joined the newly formed North Wales Coast Football League in the West Premier Division.

The club is affiliated to the North Wales Coast Football Association and Football Association of Wales.

Honours
Anglesey League – Champions: 2004–05

External links
Official club website
Official club Twitter
Official club Facebook

References

Welsh Alliance League clubs
Sport in Anglesey
Football clubs in Wales
North Wales Coast Football League clubs
Anglesey League clubs
Gwynedd League clubs
Bangor & District League clubs